Lecanoromycetes is the largest class of lichenized fungi. It belongs to the subphylum Pezizomycotina in the phylum Ascomycota. The asci (spore-bearing cells) of the Lecanoromycetes most often release spores by rostrate dehiscence.

They are monophyletic (a group of taxa composed only of a common ancestor).

Genera of uncertain placement
The are several genera in the Lecanoromycetes that have not been placed into any order or family. These are:
Argopsis  – 1 sp.
Ascographa  - 1 sp.
Bartlettiella  – 1 sp.
Bouvetiella  – 1 sp.
Buelliastrum  – 1 sp.
Haploloma  – 1 sp.
Hosseusia  – 3 spp.
Korfiomyces  – 1 sp.
Maronella  – 1 sp.
Notolecidea  – 1 sp.
Petractis  – 3 spp.
Piccolia  – 10 spp.
Ravenelula  – 2 spp.
Robincola  – 1 sp.
Roburnia  – 1 sp.

References

 
Fungus classes
Lichen classes
Taxa described in 1997